Leela Sumant Moolgaokar (10 October 1916 – 20 May 1992) was an Indian social worker, known for pioneering volunteer blood transfusion service in India. Her husband, Sumant Moolgaokar was Chairman of Tata Motors and also remained Vice-Chairman of Tata Steel.

She started her career as a radiographer at the St George Hospital, Mumbai. In 1965, she started Tata Motors Grahini Social Welfare Society (TMGSWS), which ran employment generation schemes for the women in household of company employees.

She was awarded the Padma Shri, fourth highest civilian honour of India by the President of India, in 1963. She remained Sheriff of Bombay in 1975–76.

References

1916 births
1992 deaths
Marathi people
Recipients of the Padma Shri in social work
Social workers
Medical doctors from Mumbai
Sheriffs of Mumbai
20th-century Indian medical doctors
Indian women medical doctors
20th-century Indian women scientists
Women scientists from Maharashtra
Social workers from Maharashtra
Women educators from Maharashtra
Educators from Maharashtra
20th-century women physicians